A. M. Sullivan may refer to:
Alexander Martin Sullivan (Irish politician) (1829–1884), Irish journalist, politician, and author
Aloysius Michael Sullivan (1896–1980), American poet
A. M. Sullivan (lawyer) (1871–1959), Irish lawyer